Universal Logic, Inc., formerly Universal Robotics, Inc., is an artificial intelligence software engineering and robotics integration company headquartered in Nashville, Tennessee. 

The Company was founded in 2008 by brothers, David and Alan Peters.  In 2015, the company received its first million-dollar contract.

Leadership

Universal Robotics is led by David Peters, CEO, Nick Buchta, President, and Goutham Mallapragada, CTO.

References

Companies established in 2001
Robotics companies of the United States
Software companies based in Tennessee
Software companies of the United States